Wayne Darcy Peckham (1944-2016) was an Indigenous Australian rugby league footballer who played in the 1960s and 1970s. He played for Penrith and Canterbury as a centre but also played on the wing and as a second rower. Wayne Peckham was an Inaugural player for Penrith and the club's First Indigenous Player.

Playing career
Originally from Moree, Peckham made his first grade debut for the newly admitted Penrith side in 1967.  Peckham played in the club's first ever game against Canterbury-Bankstown which ended in a 15-12 defeat.  In the club's inaugural season, Penrith finished second last on the table, 5 points clear of wooden spooners Cronulla.  Peckham went on to play 2 further seasons for Penrith before signing with Canterbury-Bankstown.  Peckham went on to play 3 seasons with Canterbury and spent most of his time there changing between the reserve grade and first grade sides.  At the end of 1972, Peckham retired from rugby league.  He died on 24 October 2016 aged 72.

References

1944 births
2016 deaths
Australian rugby league players
Penrith Panthers players
Canterbury-Bankstown Bulldogs players
Rugby league wingers
Rugby league centres
Rugby league players from New South Wales